Proxy may refer to:

Arts, entertainment and media

Fictional entities
 Proxy, a mysterious humanoid lifeform in the anime Ergo Proxy 
 PROXY, a holodroid featured in Star Wars: The Force Unleashed
 Proxy, the codename of Wendy Harris, a fictional character in the Batgirl comic book series
 "Proxy", the name of a fictional character in the 2012 horror film Smiley
 "Proxy", a term, specifically (but not limited to) in Slender: The Arrival, for a person who is influenced or controlled by the Slender Man

Music
 Proxies (band), British electronic rock band formed in 2010
 "Proxy" (song), a 2014 song by Martin Garrix
 "The Proxy", a song by RJD2 on his 2002 album Deadringer

Other uses in arts, entertainment and media
 Proxy (film), a 2013 horror film directed by Zack Parker
 Proxies (film), a 1921 silent drama film directed by George D. Baker
 The Proxy, a drama web series starring Stuart Ashen
 Proxy card, a substitute card used in trading card games when a player does not own the substituted card and also can occur when proxy cards are not tradeable
 Proxy (novel), a 2013 young adult novel by Alex London

Computing and technology
 ProxyAddress, a service providing postal addresses for homeless people
 Proxy pattern, a software design pattern in computer programming, also known as a proxy class
 Proxy server, a computer network service that allows clients to make indirect network connections to other network services

Other uses
 Proxy or agent (law), a substitute authorized to act for another entity or a document which authorizes the agent so to act
 Proxy (climate), a measured variable used to infer the value of a variable of interest in climate research
 Proxy (statistics), a measured variable used to infer the value of a variable of interest
 Healthcare proxy, a document used to specify an agent to make medical decisions for a patient in case they are incapacitated
 Proxy bullying (or vicarious bullying), bullying committed on behalf of somebody else
 Proxy fight, attempting to influence how company shareholders use their proxy votes
 Proxy marriage, common amongst European monarchs, where one party is not present in person to their marriage to the other
 Proxy murder, a murder committed on behalf of somebody else
 Proxy statement, information published related to a U.S. stockholders' meeting
 Proxy voting, a vote cast on behalf of an absent person
 Proxy war, a war where two powers use third parties as a substitute for fighting each other directly
 Torture by proxy, torturing someone on somebody else's behalf

See also
 Münchausen syndrome by proxy
 Proxi, a computer application 
 Vicarious (disambiguation)